Michael Haydn's Symphony No. 26 in E-flat major, Perger 17, Sherman 26, MH 340, written in Salzburg in 1783, was the first of the only three symphonies published in his lifetime. It was one of several E-flat major symphonies attributed to Joseph Haydn (Hob. I:Es17).

Scored for 2 oboes, 2 bassoons, 2 horns and strings, in three movements:

Allegro spiritoso
Adagietto affettuoso (in A-flat major)
Presto

The first of these movements is now acknowledged by scholars to have been an important influence on Wolfgang Amadeus Mozart's Symphony No. 39, K. 543 in the same key.

Discography 

This symphony is included on disc 6 of a set of 20 symphonies on the CPO label with Bohdan Warchal conducting the Slovak Philharmonic. It has also been recorded by Capella Savaria conducted by Pál Németh on the Hungaroton label, and by Florian Heyerick with the Academia Palatina on the label Etcetera.

Notes

References
 A. Delarte, "A Quick Overview Of The Instrumental Music Of Michael Haydn" Bob's Poetry Magazine November 2006: 22 PDF
 Charles H. Sherman and T. Donley Thomas, Johann Michael Haydn (1737 - 1806), a chronological thematic catalogue of his works. Stuyvesant, New York: Pendragon Press (1993)
 C. Sherman, "Johann Michael Haydn" in The Symphony: Salzburg, Part 2 London: Garland Publishing (1982): lxviii
 M. H. Schmid, liner notes to Warchal box set: 20 - 22

Symphony 26
1783 compositions
Compositions in E-flat major